Burrau is a Danish surname. Notable people with the surname include:

 Carl Jensen Burrau (1867–1944), Danish mathematician
 Øyvind Burrau (1896–1979), Danish physicist

Danish-language surnames